Lichten is a surname. Notable people with the surname include:

 Joseph L. Lichten (1906–1987), Polish-American lawyer and diplomat
 Mike Lichten, American football coach

See also
 Lichnov (Bruntál District), village in the Czech Republic